The ICC Future Tours Programme (or FTP for short) is a schedule of international cricket tours which structure the programme of cricket for International Cricket Council full members, with an objective of each team playing each other at least once at home and once away over a period of 10 years. If the cricket boards of two individual countries reach an agreement, they can play more than two series. If a team does not want to travel to a particular country for a bilateral series due to security reasons, then, by the mutual agreement of the respective boards, that series can be shifted to a neutral venue such as United Arab Emirates or any other country where the facilities are deemed good.

ICC Future Tours Programme (2018–2023) 
On 20 June 2018, the ICC announced new FTP starting from 2018 and ending in 2023. This FTP features the inaugural ICC World Test Championships in 2019–21 and 2021–23, consisting of the top 9 Test teams, and ODI Championship consisting of 13 teams.

As per the new FTP, the 2021 Champions Trophy is to be replaced by a World T20 scheduled to be held in India, hence making the 2017 edition held in England to be the last one and making way for two back to back World T20s. Moreover, ICC has also granted Twenty20 International Status to all the 105 Members.

ICC Future Tours Programme (2024–2031) 
On June 2, 2021, ICC published the new FTP of its global events for 8 years starting from 2024 and will be concluded with the 2031 World Test Championship final.
Within this period two 50-over Cricket World Cup (2027, 2031) and four T20 World Cup (2024, 2026, 2028, 2030) will be played. The ICC Champions Trophy which was last played in 2017, was revived again and will be played twice in 2025 and 2029.

As the ICC faced criticism for reducing the number of teams to only ten in the World Cup in 2019 and 2023, the apex body decided to increase the teams to 14 from the 2027 World Cup, like the 2015 edition. The ICC has also increased the number of teams to 20 for the ICC Men's T20 World Cup from 2024 edition.

For Women's cricket, the ICC has increased the number of teams to ten (from 8) for the 50-over Women's Cricket World Cup, starting from 2029, though the 2025 edition will be played by eight teams. From the 2026 edition, the Women's T20 World Cup will be a twelve-team affair, being increased from ten. From 2027, the ICC has also planned to start a 6-team ICC Women's T20 Champions Cup at an interval of four years.

In November 2021, the ICC published the list of hosts for all ICC tournaments for this 8 year cycle.

References

External links
 The Schedule as at 20 November 2014.
 ICC Future Tours Programme (FTP) 2017-2020
 ICC FTP 2019-23 released on 20 June 2018
 ipl 2019 schedule

International cricket tours